Andrés Molteni and Hugo Nys were the defending champions but chose not to defend their title.

Sadio Doumbia and Fabien Reboul won the title after defeating Robert Galloway and Alex Lawson 6–7(4–7), 7–5, [10–4] in the final.

Seeds

Draw

References

External links
 Main draw

Open du Pays d'Aix - Doubles
2021 Doubles